Jacarenema Ecological Reserve is an ecological reserve in the state of Espírito Santo, Brazil.
It is near the city of Vila Velha, is readily accessible to the public and does not conform to standard Brazilian definitions of environmental units.

Location

It was created by Municipal decree 056/83.
It is accessible for fishing, swimming and boating.
The reserve may be reached via the 1896 Madalena bridge from the Barra do Jucu neighbourhood, or by walking along the Itaparica beach from the north.
There are ruins of Jesuit buildings in the reserve.

The Jacarenema Ecological Reserve was created by state law 5.427 of 1997 at the initiative of deputy Claudio Vereza, supported by governor Vitor Buaiz.
The reserve's definition does not conform to the National System of Conservation Units (SNUC) which does not recognise this type of conservation unit.

Environment

The Jacarenema State Ecological Reserve contains sandbank vegetation of the Atlantic Forest biome that is still in good condition.
The mangroves along the river bank include Avicennia germinans (42.26%), Laguncularia racemosa (34.42%), Hibiscus tilliaceus (9.80%) and Rhizophora mangle (4.57%)
The river often receives waste water from the municipalities along its course, as well as urban garbage that accumulates around the mangroves at its mouth in the ecological reserve.
A 2006 report found that 5.45% of the standing trees were dead, apparently due to the impact of pollution.

Notes

Sources

1997 establishments in Brazil
Ecological reserves of Brazil
Protected areas of Espírito Santo
Protected areas established in 1997